Hospital Clínica Bíblica is a hospital in San José, Costa Rica. The Clínica Bíblica Hospital is the largest private hospital of Costa Rica, founded in 1929.

History
In the year 1921, a Latin American Mission project initiated in Costa Rica. In general, the life expectancy was forty-years old and there were diseases such as tuberculosis and malaria. The San Juan de Dios Hospital was the only one that existed and could only care for part of those ill. The main concern for the Strachan´s was children's health, since they found that, out of each 1000 children born per year, 355 died; 50% before they were five-years-old.

By the year 1968, significant progress in the field of national health had been made. At the same time, there was a good network of hospitals associated with the Costa Rican Social Security, such as the Calderon Guardia Hospital and the Mexico Hospital.

In this new context, the Latin American Mission believed that, on the one hand, their work had already been served and it should leave in order to take their assistance to others. This involved the closing of the Clinica Biblica Hospital, which, so far, had been sustained by foreign aid. It had ample facilities, good medical staff and an excellent technological team. Nevertheless, without financial support, it was impossible to continue working.

References

Hospitals in San José, Costa Rica
Hospitals established in 1921